Paris Crossing is an unincorporated community in southern Montgomery Township, Jennings County, Indiana, United States.  It lies along State Road 250, south of the town of Vernon, the county seat of Jennings County.  Its elevation is 623 feet (190 m), and it is located at  (38.8295010, -85.6480215).  Although Paris Crossing is unincorporated, it has a post office, with the ZIP code of 47270.

History
Paris Crossing was named from the location by the railroad outside of Paris, Indiana. The Paris Crossing post office was established in 1876.

References

Unincorporated communities in Jennings County, Indiana
Unincorporated communities in Indiana